Sundadanio rubellus is a danionin in the family Cyprinidae. It is endemic to Kalimantan, Indonesian Borneo, and known from the southern Kapuas River delta. It lives in peat swamp forests.

Sundadanio rubellus reaches a maximum size of  standard length.

References

Sundadanio
Freshwater fish of Indonesia
Freshwater fish of Borneo
Endemic fauna of Indonesia
Endemic fauna of Borneo
Taxa named by Kevin W. Conway
Taxa named by Maurice Kottelat
Taxa named by Heok Hui Tan
Fish described in 2011